Disgorge is a death metal band from San Diego, California, formed in 1992.

History

Bryan Ugartechea, Tony Freithoffer and Ricky Myers formed Disgorge in 1992. The same year they released their first demo, Cognitive Lust of Mutilation, before moving shortly afterwards to San Diego, California to establish themselves in the underground scene. During the move, the band parted ways with bassist/vocalist Ugartechea. New vocalist Matti Way and bassist Eric Flesy were recruited to fill Ugartechea's dual role. The band wrote new material for their second demo 95 Demo, which was distributed worldwide. Disgorge played many shows throughout 1995 to broaden their fan base, and in 1996 recorded the first four tracks of Cranial Impalement which was not released at the time, but was later distributed by Extremities Productions.

In 1997, Freithoffer and Flesy left the band. Myers and Way began looking for new replacements, who were found in late 1998. Guitarist Diego Sanchez and bassist Ben Marlin of Strangulation, a local death metal band, decided to join Disgorge. Disgorge then signed with Unique Leader Records, and shortly after released their full-length album, She Lay Gutted, in November 1999. After the release of that album, the band toured in Europe, North America and South America. Way quit the band in 2001, and was replaced by A.J. Magana, ex-vocalist of Deprecated.

Disgorge recorded their third album, Consume the Forsaken, with Magana as the vocalist. Magana parted ways with the band soon after recording. Their fourth album, Parallels of Infinite Torture, featured new vocalist Levi Fuselier and guitarist Ed Talorda. Disgorge played in Japan, Australia, New Zealand, Thailand, Mexico, and Indonesia in support of the album. The band appeared in the opening scene of the film Paranormal Activity, performing the song "Consume The Forsaken". On January 2, 2008, bassist Ben Marlin died, aged 31, after battling cancer for more than a year and a half.

Sanchez, Talorda, and Way, along with Oscar Ramirez and Scott Ellis of Warface, formed To Violently Vomit; a Disgorge tribute band. Magana also performed vocals for a few shows, as did Angel Ochoa of Condemned. They debuted on September 11, 2009, at The Jumping Turtle in San Marcos, California, and continued playing in the southern California area.  

In May 2011, Myers announced that Disgorge is working on their new album And the Weak Shall Perish. The new lineup would include Fuselier, Myers, Erik Lindmark of Deeds of Flesh, and Derek Boyer of Suffocation and Decrepit Birth.

On May 7, 2013, Disgorge announced a new deal with Extreme Management Group Inc, and a new touring and recording line up comprising Ricky Myers, Diego Soria, Angel Ochoa, Ed Talorda, and Diego Sanchez.

Band name
There are and have been a number of other bands named Disgorge; hailing from Argentina, Germany, Mexico, Netherlands, Norway and Sweden.

Band members
Ricky Myers - drums (1992-present)
Diego Sanchez - guitar (1998-present)
Ed Talorda - guitar (2004-present)
Diego Soria - bass (2013-present)
Angel Ochoa - vocals (2013-present)

 Former members
Brian Ugartechea - bass (1992-1995)
Tony Freithoffer - guitar (1992-1997)
David Hill - guitar (1994-1995)
Matti Way - vocals (1994-2001)
Eric Flesley - bass (1995-1997)
John Remmen - guitar (1995-1996)
Derek Boyer - bass (1996, 2011-2012)
Ben Marlin - bass (1998-2008; died 2008)
A.J. Magana - vocals (2000-2002)
Levi Fuselier - vocals (2003-2011)
Brad Kole - guitar (2011-2012)
Erik Lindmark - guitar (2011-2012)
Oscar Ramirez - bass (2012-2013)
Shane Washington - bass (2012)
Nate Twyman - vocals (2012-2013)

Discography

Albums
Cranial Impalement (1999)
She Lay Gutted (1999)
Consume the Forsaken (2002)
Parallels of Infinite Torture (2005)

Demos
Cognitive Lust of Mutilation (1992)
Demo 1995 (1995)

References

External links

Disgorge on Facebook

Musical groups from San Diego
Death metal musical groups from California
Musical groups established in 1992
Musical quintets